"Love Makes Sweet Music" was the first single released by the psychedelic rock group Soft Machine. It is one of the first British psychedelic releases, predating Pink Floyd's "Arnold Layne" by a month. The A-side is more pop-oriented, featuring Robert Wyatt on lead vocals. The other side, "Feelin’ Reelin Squeelin" is a disturbing tour de force with Kevin Ayers handling the lead vocal for the verses, while Wyatt sings the chorus; there is an elliptical series of strange noises and flute in the solo.

The single was a commercial flop.

The tracks from the single have been reissued on the Soft Machine compilations Triple Echo and Out-Bloody-Rageous - An Anthology 1967 -1973 (Sony), on the 1972 Polydor compilation LP Rare Tracks, and on the 2009 CD edition of the album The Soft Machine. A cover of "Love Makes Sweet Music" was recorded by The Valentines, an early band of AC/DC frontman Bon Scott, as a B-side for their cover of "Peculiar Hole in the Sky".

Track listing

"Love Makes Sweet Music" (Kevin Ayers)
"Feelin’ Reelin' Squeelin’" (Kevin Ayers)

Personnel 
Kevin Ayers - guitar ("Love Makes Sweet Music"), bass ("Feelin..."), vocals
Daevid Allen - bass ("Love Makes Sweet Music"), guitar ("Feelin...")
Robert Wyatt – drums, vocals
Mike Ratledge - keyboards

References

External links
http://www.headheritage.co.uk/unsung/review/1790 Review

Kevin Ayers songs
1967 debut singles
Songs written by Kevin Ayers
Song recordings produced by Chas Chandler
1967 songs
Polydor Records singles